Qasemi may refer to:
Qasemi, Nishapur, village in Razavi Khorasan Province, Iran
Qasemi, Sabzevar, village in Razavi Khorasan Province, Iran
Qasemi, South Khorasan, village in South Khorasan Province, Iran
Al-Qasemi Academic College of Education, academic college in Baqa al-Gharbiyye in the Haifa District in Israel
Mirza Qasemi, Northern Iranian appetizer of roasted aubergine distinct to the Caspian Sea region
Shamsuddin Qasemi (1935–1996), Bangladeshi Islamic scholar and politician